James Joseph Boyle (died 1944) was an Irish teacher and Fianna Fáil politician.

A national school teacher from Horseleap, on the border between Westmeath and Offaly, Boyle was a member of Offaly County Council and had been an active Republican since 1915. He was elected to the Seanad at the elections in December 1934, the 13th of 23 Senators elected. A member of the national executive of Fianna Fáil, he died at his home on 19 October 1944.

References

Year of birth missing
1944 deaths
Fianna Fáil senators
Members of the 1934 Seanad
Local councillors in County Offaly